Tallaproddatur (also Thallaproddatur) is a village located in Kondapuram Mandal, Cuddapah District, Andhra Pradesh, India. At the 2001 census, it had a population of 3,780.

References

Villages in Kadapa district